Asmawi Bakiri (born 10 September 1974) is a former Malaysian footballer. He also a writer and sports commentator for Malaysia television Astro Arena.

Career

Club
In the early 90s, Asmawi made his debut in the Malaysian League with Selangor President's Cup team. His first goal for Selangor was in the 1997 FA Cup quarter final 2-2 draw against Kelantan at Kota Bahru. He won three Malaysia Cup with Selangor from 1995 until 1997. He move to Penang in 1999 but only stay for one season. On the next season he move to Sabah before returning to Selangor. On 4 August 2001, he played in 2001 Sultan of Selangor Cup. In 2002 until 2003 he played for Sabah and help them reaching back to back Malaysia Cup final but only finished as the runners up. In 2004 he played for Perak and won the Malaysia FA Cup.

International
In 1993 while playing for Selangor in the President's Cup, Asmawi was called up with the national under 23 team for a training stint in Sri Lanka. In 1994 he played all matches of the Dunhill Cup against Japan U-23, Denmark U-21 and Norway U-21. Under Abdul Rahman Ibrahim, he made his senior international debut in a 2-1 win over New Zealand on 1 July 1999. His only international goal is against Brunei at the 1999 Southeast Asian Games where Malaysia won 2-0.

Honours
Selangor
Malaysia Cup: 1995, 1996, 1997
Malaysia Charity Shield: 1996
Malaysia FA Cup: 1997

Perak
Malaysia FA Cup: 2004

References

Living people
Malaysian footballers
Perak F.C. players
Selangor FA players
1974 births
Association football defenders